David William Kilgour  (February 18, 1941 – April 5, 2022) was a Canadian human rights activist, author, lawyer, and politician. He was also a Senior Fellow to the Raoul Wallenberg Centre for Human Rights.

Kilgour graduated from the University of Manitoba in economics in 1962 and the University of Toronto law school in 1966. From crown attorney in northern Alberta to Canadian Cabinet minister, Kilgour ended his 27-year tenure in the House of Commons of Canada as an Independent MP. Upon retirement, he was one of the longest serving members of parliament and one of few who had been elected under both the Progressive Conservative and Liberal banners.

Member of Parliament
Kilgour was originally elected as a member of the Progressive Conservative Party in 1979. However, his first attempt at election, in the 1968 federal election in the riding of Vancouver Centre as a Progressive Conservative was unsuccessful. He ran again as a Tory in the 1979 election in Edmonton, and was a member of parliament for about 27 years. In April 1990, he was expelled from the Tory national caucus after criticizing the Mulroney government's policies. He sat as an independent for several months before joining the Liberals.

In the Liberal government, he served as the Deputy Speaker (1993–1997) and Chairman of Committees of the Whole of the House of Commons, Secretary of State (Latin America and Africa) (1997–2002), and Secretary of State (Asia-Pacific) (2002–2003). In the Conservative governments of Joe Clark and Brian Mulroney he served as Parliamentary Secretary to the President of the Privy Council, the Minister for CIDA, the Minister of Indian and Northern Affairs, and the Minister of Transport.

As a Secretary of State, Kilgour was continuously vocal on many human rights violations around the world. In 2001 while visiting Zimbabwe, Kilgour was vocally critical of Mugabe's farm-invasions policy and pushed for increasing international pressure. In December 2004, he was among the Ukrainian election monitor delegation of the federal run-off elections.

In April 2005, he received media attention when he speculated about quitting the Liberal Party because of his disgust with the sponsorship scandal, saying that the issue made Canada look like "a northern banana republic". On April 12, 2005, he announced that he would sit as an independent MP. He also cited Canada's lack of action on the crisis in Darfur, Sudan, as reasons for quitting. He asserted that he has no plans to move back to the Conservatives, and stated that he had no plans to run for re-election.

From 1979 to 1988, he represented the riding of Edmonton—Strathcona, but with shifting constituency lines moved to the Edmonton Southeast in 1988, and then again to Edmonton—Mill Woods—Beaumont in 2004 which he represented until he retired from politics at the 2006 election.

Because of the unusual structure of the 38th House of Commons, in May 2005, David Kilgour's lone vote had the power to bring down or support the government. He used this influence to urge the Martin government to send peacekeepers to Darfur. He was an endorser of the Genocide Intervention Network. Then-Prime Minister Paul Martin agreed to send humanitarian support but in the end, no peacekeepers were sent.

Electoral history

Democracy activism
While being a lifelong practicing Christian, Kilgour has worked on issues such as inter-faith dialog, personal freedoms, and democratic government throughout his career. In Parliament, he was active in prayer groups while at venues and publications across the country he has spoken specifically on religious themes and politics. Commonly, his topics have been on global religious and political persecutions. He served as a fellow of the Queen's University Centre for the Study of Democracy; a director of the Washington-based Council for a Community of Democracies (CCD), and co-chair of the Canadian Friends of a Democratic Iran, and has hosted an Iran pro-democracy rally  attended by approximately 90,000 in France in 2009.

His personal religious beliefs landed him in the news in 2003 when he abstained from the same-sex marriage bill and was reprimanded by then Prime Minister Chrétien.

Organ harvesting of Falun Gong practitioners in China

In 2006, allegations emerged that a large number of Falun Gong practitioners had been killed to supply China's organ transplant industry. With David Matas he released the Kilgour-Matas report, which stated "the source of 41,500 transplants for the six-year period 2000 to 2005 is unexplained" and "we believe that there have been and continue today to be large-scale organ seizures from unwilling Falun Gong practitioners". In 2009, they published an updated version of the report as a book. They traveled to about 50 countries to raise awareness of the situation.

In 2012, State Organs: Transplant Abuse in China, edited by David Matas and Dr. Torsten Trey, was published with essays from six medical professionals, Ethan Gutmann, David Matas and an essay co-written by Kilgour. Ethan Gutmann interviewed over 100 witnesses and estimated that 65,000 Falun Gong practitioners were killed for their organs from 2000 to 2008.

Personal life and death
Kilgour was married to Laura Scott, with whom he had five children. He died on April 5, 2022, in Ottawa at the age of 81, from lung disease.

Articles
 Organ Pillaging from Falun Gong in China Subcommittee on Human Rights of European Parliament, Brussels, December 1, 2009

Books
 Uneasy patriots: Western Canadians in confederation (1988)
 Inside Outer Canada (1990)
 Betrayal: The spy Canada abandoned (1994)
 Uneasy Neighbours: Canada, The USA and the Dynamics of State, Industry and Culture (2007) with David T. Jones
 Bloody Harvest: The Killing of Falun Gong for Their Organs (2009) with David Matas

Recognition
Throughout his parliamentary career, Kilgour has been awarded a wide range of awards, including: the Kaputiman Award from the Council of Edmonton Filipino Associations; the Special Award from the Ukrainian Canadian Congress (Alberta Provincial Council); an Outstanding Service Award from the Edmonton Sikh community; the Religious Liberty Award from the International Religious Liberty Association in Washington, D.C., Liberty Magazine and the Seventh-day Adventist Church; and as Chairman of the Parliamentary Group for Soviet Jewry, he was recognized by B'nai Brith Canada for his effort and commitment to bringing the plight of the Soviet Jewry to the attention of Canadians.

In May 2006, he received an honorary Doctor of Divinity (D.D.(Hon)) degree from Knox College, University of Toronto. Kilgour, a Presbyterian, was recognized for his commitment to human rights in Canada and abroad and particularly his challenge to the international community to respond to the plight of Darfur, as well as in Burma, and Zimbabwe.
For their organ harvesting work, Matas and Kilgour won the 2009 Human Rights Award from the German-based International Society for Human Rights and were nominated for the 2010 Nobel Peace Prize.

Relations
He is the brother of Geills Turner, who is married to former Canadian Prime Minister John Turner. Kilgour and his sister are the great nephew and niece of John McCrae, the soldier and poet who wrote In Flanders Fields, and also the great nephew and niece of John Wentworth Russell, who painted the portrait of Sir Wilfrid Laurier, which hangs in the House of Commons.

Documentaries
He appeared in Red Reign: The Bloody Harvest of China's Prisoners (2013), Davids and Goliath (2014), and was interviewed in Free China: The Courage to Believe.  He is also briefly in the 2012 documentary film "Death by China."

See also
 Organ harvesting from Falun Gong practitioners in China
 Persecution of Falun Gong
 Ethan Gutmann
 David Matas

References

External links
 Official website david-kilgour.com
 
 An Independent Investigation into Allegations of Organ Harvesting of Falun Gong Practitioners in China (2007) David Kilgour, David Matas
 Killed for Organs: China's Secret State Transplant Business (2012) YouTube video, 8 minutes

1941 births
2022 deaths
Canadian Presbyterians
Independent MPs in the Canadian House of Commons
Members of the 26th Canadian Ministry
Members of the House of Commons of Canada from Alberta
Members of the King's Privy Council for Canada
Lawyers in Alberta
Liberal Party of Canada MPs
Progressive Conservative Party of Canada MPs
Politicians from Winnipeg
University of Manitoba alumni
University of Toronto Faculty of Law alumni
Deaths from lung disease